Marinella Senatore (born 1977) is an Italian visual artist.

Exhibitions 

 2011 – Museum of Contemporary Art of Rome, Rome, IT
 2012 – Kunstlerhaus Bethanien, Berlin, D
 2012 – Matadero, Madrid, ES
 2012 – Quad, Derby, UK
 2012 – ViaFarini, Milan, IT
 2013 – Castello di Rivoli (Turin)
 2013 – Musei Civici, Cagliari, IT
 2013 – Nomas Foundation/Teatro Valle occupato, Rome, IT
 2014 – Estman Radio, INSITU, Berlin, D 
 2014 – Kunsthalle St.Gallen, CH
 2014 – Museum of Contemporary Art, Santa Barbara, US
 2014 – The School of Narrative Dance, Israel, Petach Tikva Museum of Art, IL
 2014 – MOT International, London, UK

Awards 

 2009: Dena Foundation Fellowship
 2010: New York Prize
 2011: fellowship, The American Academy in Rome; finalist, Furla Art Award;
 2013: Gotham Prize; fellowship, Castello di Rivoli – Museum of Contemporary Art. 
 2014: Maxxi Prize.

Residencies 

 2005 – Ratti Foundation, Como, IT
 2009 – Art Omi, Omi International Center, Ghent, US
 2010 – ISCP, Brooklyn, New York, US
 2011 – Künstlerhaus Bethanien, Berlin, D
 2012 – American Academy in Rome IT
 2012 – Via Farini, Milan, IT

References 

1977 births
Living people
Italian contemporary artists
21st-century Italian women artists